The Weerodara Vibhushanaya (WV, Decoration of Heroism) (Sinhala: වීරෝධාර වීභූෂණය vīrōdāra vibhūṣanaya) is the second-highest decoration awarded by the Military of Sri Lanka awarded for:

The award is equivalent to the British George Cross and the Indian Ashoka Chakra Award, and is the highest peacetime military decoration awarded by Sri Lanka.

Award process 
The medal is awarded to all ranks of the tri forces (both regular- and volunteer service personnel) and civilians., following recommendation by service commanders. The degree of courage shown is taken into consideration during the review process.

The award is presented by the President, with recipients able to use the post-nominal letters "WV".

Selected recipients
Navy
Admiral D.W.S. Dissanayake
Vice Admiral Ravindra Wijegunaratne
Army

 Colonel C D Wickramanayake - Sri Lanka Engineers

Warrant Officer P. L. S. L. Cooray - Sri Lanka Sinha Regiment
Corporal R P R Wickramapala - Sri Lanka Sinha Regiment
Air Force
Corporal  D.A.W.M.N.D.B Rathnayake
Warrant Officer Y.M.S. Yaparathne

References

External links
Ministry of Defence, Sri Lanka
Sri Lanka Army
Sri Lanka Navy
Sri Lanka Air Force

Military awards and decorations of Sri Lanka
Awards established in 1981